The 1957 Dixie Classic was a mid-season college basketball tournament held December 26–28, 1957 at NC State's Reynolds Coliseum in Raleigh, North Carolina. It was the ninth iteration of the Dixie Classic, and it was part of the 1957–58 NCAA University Division men's basketball season.

Coming into the tournament, the clear favorite to win the tournament was North Carolina, the reigning champions with a 5–1 record so far in the season. For the third consecutive year, the Big Four teams swept their first round opponents. In a slow-paced final, North Carolina defeated NC State 39–30. In the third-place matchup, Duke's Bobby Vernon scored all 14 of his team's points in overtime to pull out a 79–75 victory over Wake Forest.

Pete Brennan of North Carolina was voted most valuable player, having tallied 53 points and 28 rebounds in the Tar Heels' three wins. Across the three days of six double-headers, the total attendance was 69,200.

Teams
Each year, the Dixie Classic included the "Big Four" teams (Duke, NC State, North Carolina, and Wake Forest), as well as four other invited teams. The 1957 teams were:
 Wake Forest Demon Deacons
 Duquesne Dukes
 NC State Wolfpack
 Northwestern Wildcats
 North Carolina Tar Heels
 St. Louis Billikens
 Duke Blue Devils
 Seton Hall Pirates

Bracket

Game log

References

1957–58 NCAA University Division men's basketball season
1957 in sports in North Carolina
December 1957 sports events in the United States
1957